Michael Garschall (born 1967) is an Austrian artistic director, cultural manager and theatre director.

Career 
From 1994 until 1998, zeichnete er als Pressereferent der Anton Bruckner Private University in Linz für die Organisation von Veranstaltungen verantwortlich. 2001 bis 2004 war er bei Steinway in Austria in Wien im Bereich Marketing und Organisation tätig.

Autumn Days Blindenmarkt 
In 1990, while still a student, Garschall founded the operetta festival  in his home municipality. Since its inception, more than 270,000 guests have attended this Mostviertel festival. Thanks to Garschall's commitment, the long-standing heart project of a modern venue for the Herbsttage Blindenmarkt could be realised with the opening of the Ybbsfeldhalle in 2016. The declared aim of the festival is the contemporary presentation of the operetta genre. Garschall repeatedly focuses on operetta rarities, whose productions are well received far beyond the borders of Lower Austria. Another characteristic feature is the successful combination of professional artists and amateurs from the region.

In 2007, initiiert Garschall gemeinsam mit der Unternehmerin  die Sozialinitiative helfen mit kunst, um benachteiligten Menschen jedes Jahr den Besuch einer Operettenvorstellung zu ermöglichen. Seit 2019 hat er das Konzert für alle ins Leben gerufen, um potentielles Klassik-Publikum bei freiem Antritt anzuwerben.

Opera Klosterneuburg 
Since 1998, Garschall has directed the operklosterneuburg, which over the years has risen to become Austria's third largest open-air opera festival... For numerous young singers, the festival became a springboard for international careers, including Daniela Fally, Annely Peebo, Florian Boesch, Markus Werba, Pavol Breslik, Günther Groissböck, as well as conductors such as Thomas Rösner and Andrés Orozco-Estrada. In addition to popular works of opera literature from Mozart to Donizetti to Verdi, the programme also includes lesser-known works such as Rossini's comic opera Le Comte Ory. For the younger generation, the festival offers specially adapted versions - the Oper für Kinder.

Functions 
As a jury member, he takes part in various singing competitions (Nico-Dostal-Operetta Competition, Konservatorium Wien Privatuniversität, Klassik Mania etc.) and participates in the jury of the literature competition Forum Land as well as in the Kulturbeirat des Amtes der Niederösterreichischen Landesregierung.

Productions 
Garschall staged among others L'Elisir d'Amore by Gaetano Donizetti (operklosterneuburg), the Barber of Seville by Giovanni Paisiello and La Contessina by Florian Leopold Gassmann (Festwochen Schärding), La Serva Padrona by Giovanni Battista Pergolesi (Schloss Hof), Orpheus in the Underworld by Jacques Offenbach and Die Fledermaus by Johann Strauss (Herbsttage Blindenmarkt).

Awards 
 1993: Bronze Badge of Honour of the municipality of Blindenmarkt.
 1994: Award of the Province of Lower Austria
 1999: Gold Badge of Honour of the Market Town of Blindenmarkt
 2000: Award of the Lower Austrian Regional School Board
 2003/2006: Thanks and recognition of the Lower Austrian Regional School Board
 2003: Recognition Award of the Province of Lower Austria for the Performing Arts
 2004: Ring of Honour of the Market Town of Blindenmarkt
 2007: Golden coat of arms of the municipality of Klosterneuburg
 2015: Golden 
 2017: Culture Award of the Municipality of Klosterneuburg
 2021: Decoration of Honour for Services to the Republic of Austria

External links 

 
 
 operklosterneuburg

References 

Austrian opera directors
Austrian theatre directors
1967 births
Living people
People from Lower Austria